Bad Bergzabern is a Verbandsgemeinde ("collective municipality") in the Südliche Weinstraße district, in Rhineland-Palatinate, Germany. The seat of the municipality is in Bad Bergzabern.

The Verbandsgemeinde Bad Bergzabern consists of the following Ortsgemeinden ("local municipalities"):

Verbandsgemeinde in Rhineland-Palatinate
Südliche Weinstraße